Black Friday was the nickname given by the 1st Battalion The Black Watch (Royal Highland Regiment) of Canada to the date 13 October 1944. On that day, during World War II's Battle of the Scheldt in The Netherlands, the regiment attacked German positions on a raised railway embankment near the village of Hoogerheide after advancing across 1,200 yards of open beet fields. When final casualty totals were tabulated, it was determined the battalion had lost 145 men killed or captured; fifty-six men were killed, including all four of the commanders of the lettered companies, and twenty-seven men were taken prisoner. One company of ninety men had only four men present and fit for duty the next day.

Background
By September, 1944, it had become urgent for the Allies to clear both banks of the Scheldt estuary in order to open the port of Antwerp to Allied shipping, thus easing logistical burdens in their supply lines stretching hundreds of miles from Normandy eastward to the Siegfried Line on the border with Germany. Since the Allied forces had landed in Normandy, France on 6 June 1944 *D-Day), the British Second Army had pushed into the Low Countries and captured Brussels, Belgium, and Antwerp, the latter city with its port still intact. The advance halted with the British in possession of Antwerp, while the Germans still controlled the Scheldt Estuary. Nothing was done about the blocked Antwerp ports during September because most of the strained Allied resources were allocated to Operation Market Garden, a bold plan for a single thrust into Germany which began on September 17. In the meantime, German forces in the Scheldt were able to plan a defense.

In early October, after Market Garden had failed with heavy losses, Allied forces led by the First Canadian Army set out to bring the port of Antwerp under control. The well-established German defenders staged an effective delaying action. Complicated by the waterlogged terrain, the Battle of the Scheldt proved to be an especially grueling and costly campaign. Historians have largely ignored it until recent years. After five weeks of difficult fighting, the First Canadian Army, bolstered by attached troops from several other countries, was successful in winning the Scheldt after numerous amphibious assaults, crossings of canals, and fighting over open ground.  Both land and water were heavily mined, and the Germans defended their retreating front line with artillery and snipers.

The Allies finally cleared the port areas on November 8, but at a cost of 12,873 casualties (killed, wounded, or missing), half of them Canadians.

Battle

An area known as "the Coffin" due to its shape on maps was held by entrenched Germans of Battle Group Chill, who controlled the mouth of the Beveland isthmus. In Operation Angus, the Black Watch was tasked with attacking northward and cutting the land links between the mainland and the isthmus. The battalion attacked at 6:15 am, marching through the lines of the 1st Battalion, Royal Regiment of Canada. "C" Company jumped off 30 minutes late at the start of the operation due to small arms fire delaying their advance, and the supporting artillery attack was therefore ill-timed. By 6:55 am, “C” Company had advanced  beyond the start line and was taking fire from the Germans. During their advance across the beet fields, the Canadians experienced heavy German small arms, mortar, and artillery fire (including airbursts), and by 7:35 am, the commanders of both "B" and "C" Companies had been wounded. At about 7:50 am, snipers were reported firing on the men of "C" Company. German artillery pieces and mortars began to lay a smokescreen in order to impede further Canadian attempts to advance. Slow progress ground to a halt, and by 8:20 am, the forward-most Canadian troops were pinned down. Most of the men of "B" and "C" Companies soon retreated to their start line with covering fire from "D" Company. The commanding officer of the Black Watch, Colonel Bruce Ritchie, and the brigadier, W. J. Megill, were visited by the commanders of “A” and “D” Companies at 8:50 am, and Brigadier Megill called for air support. Ritchie and Megill visited the positions of "A" Company on the front lines at 9:45 am and developed a plan for a second attack against German positions on the railway embankment with tanks and Wasp flamethrowers. By 11:10 am, German troops reoccupied the positions formerly held by "C" Company after the latter’s forwardmost platoon was forced back by heavy machine gun fire. "B" Company had 41 men remaining, and "C" Company only 25. For about five hours, “there was little change in the companies’ positions.” At 11:45 am, twelve Spitfires conducted a strafing attack on a brickworks near the railroad embankment in an attempt to disrupt the German defences.

In the second attack, scheduled for 5:00 pm, "A" Company would advance on the right and "D" Company on the left, with the remains of "C" Company to support "D" Company.

At 5:00 pm, the attack jumped off again, supported by machine gun, tank, and artillery fire. The armored flamethrowers were employed against German positions with "considerable effect on the enemy," but one flamethrower was lost. It was reported that "A" Company had reached its objective by 6:20 pm, but their situation was described as "sticky," with German resistance being heavy. By 6:30, "D" Company was on its objective as well. In reality, "A" Company was "not nearly at its objective," and had suffered heavy losses. By the early morning of 14 October, firing on both sides quieted down, and at 1:00 am, the brigadier ordered that the battalion should be withdrawn. When the men returned to their companies' areas, they were given hot food and allowed to rest until 4:00 pm, foregoing lunch. Stretcher bearers and other medical personnel worked all day in the beet fields in order to locate and evacuate wounded men. Initial reports listed eight officers and 178 other ranks as casualties; killed, wounded, or missing in action. Total casualties were not as high as those suffered by the Black Watch during the earlier Battle of Verrieres Ridge in July 1944 (307, including five officers and 118 other ranks killed or died of wounds), but what set Black Friday apart was the final ratio of killed in action and captured to total casualties; 83 out of 145.

Notes

Further reading
The battle is described in detail in the book The Long Left Flank by Jeffery Williams.

External links
 Terry Copp, "The Battle North of Antwerp", Legion Magazine, Sept/Oct 2001

1944 in Canada
Military history of Canada
Black Watch (Royal Highland Regiment) of Canada